Lauren Berkowitz (born 1965) is an Australian artist who lives and works in Melbourne. Her work is in the collections of the National Gallery of Australia and the Art Gallery of New South Wales.

Her work was shown at the Museum of Contemporary Art, Sydney in 2010 and 2021 and the National Gallery of Victoria, Melbourne in 2014.

Selected group exhibitions

2021 The National 2021: New Australian Art, Museum of Contemporary Art Australia, Sydney 
2019 Ecosphere, MPavillion, Monash University Clayton Campus, Melbourne
2019 Fragile Ecologies, Kronenberg, Mais Wright Gallery, Sydney  
2018 Plastic Topographies, Artspace Ideas Platform, Sydney
2018 International Studio & Curatorial Program Open Studios, Brooklyn, NY, USA
2016-2017 Human/Animal/Artist, McClelland Gallery, Victoria, Australia

Collections 
 National Gallery of Australia
 Art Gallery of New South Wales

Further reading
2021 Rosa Ellen, Interview (starts at 24:18), The Art Show, ABC Radio National
2018 	Phoebe Hoban, ‘Lauren Berkowitz’s High – Wire Act’, Artspace, cat. essay

References

1965 births
Living people
Australian contemporary artists
Artists from Melbourne
21st-century Australian women artists
21st-century Australian artists